Alcatraz is an American television series created by Elizabeth Sarnoff, Steven Lilien and Bryan Wynbrandt, and produced by J. J. Abrams and Bad Robot Productions. The series premiered on Fox on January 16, 2012, as a mid-season replacement. Switching between eras, the series focuses on the Alcatraz prison, which was shut down in 1963 due to unsafe conditions for its prisoners and guards. The show's premise is that both the prisoners and the guards disappeared in 1963 and have abruptly reappeared in modern-day San Francisco, where they are being tracked down by a government agency, to prevent them from committing further crimes while also determining the reasons for their return. The series starred Sarah Jones, Jorge Garcia, Sam Neill, and Parminder Nagra.

On May 9, 2012, Fox canceled the series after one season.

Plot summary
On March 21, 1963, 256 inmates and 46 guards disappeared from the Alcatraz Federal Penitentiary without a trace. To cover up the disappearance, the government invented a cover story about the prison being closed due to unsafe conditions, and officially reported that the inmates had been transferred. However, federal agent Emerson Hauser (Sam Neill), a young San Francisco police officer tasked with transferring inmates to the island in 1963, is one of the first to discover that the inmates are actually missing and not transferred. In present-day San Francisco, the "63s" (as the missing inmates and guards are called) begin returning, one by one. Strangely, they have not aged at all, and they have no clues about their missing time or their whereabouts during their missing years; however, they appear to be returning with compulsions to find certain objects and to continue their criminal habits. Even more strangely, the government has been expecting their return, and Hauser now runs a secret government unit dedicated to finding the returning prisoners; this unit was set up long ago in anticipation of the prisoners' returns. (The cellblock at this unit has the same configuration as Alcatraz' distinctive two-level layout.) To help track down the returning prisoners and capture them, Hauser enlists police detective Rebecca Madsen (Sarah Jones) and Dr. Diego Soto (Jorge Garcia), a published expert on the history of Alcatraz and its inmates.

Opening: (Narrated by Sam Neill in every episode)

"On March 21, 1963, Alcatraz officially closed. All the prisoners were transferred off the island. Only, that's not what happened. Not at all."

Cast and characters

Main
 Sarah Jones as Rebecca Madsen, a San Francisco Police Department homicide detective with family ties to Alcatraz; she becomes involved after one of the inmates – her grandfather – is responsible for the death of her partner, directly meeting the task force when investigating the death of the former deputy warden at Alcatraz. She was raised by her great-uncle – a former Alcatraz guard and, later, cop – after the death of her parents, occasionally helping him look over his case files as she was growing up and offering useful insight into his cases, inspiring her own career.
 Jorge Garcia as Dr. Diego "Doc" Soto, a PhD in both criminal justice and Civil War history, author of books on Alcatraz, comic book store owner, writer, and artist. He claims that he received the PhDs to satisfy his parents, subsequently deliberately disgracing himself in the industry by writing a crime evaluation report using Gotham City as his example so that he could open the store. He went through an unspecified traumatic experience at age eleven involving being abducted, which affected him deeply. Although he lacks field training, Doc's detailed knowledge of the missing Alcatraz prisoners has proven invaluable in helping the task force identify and track the returning inmates.
 Sam Neill as Emerson Hauser, an FBI agent and former police officer who arrived on the dock at Alcatraz to find the prisoners gone in 1963. Currently heads the Alcatraz Task Force. Although his priority is generally to capture and contain the inmates to find out where they went and why they are coming back, he has shown that he is willing to put innocent lives over the lives of the inmates when the situation directly requires him to make a choice. He studied Philosophy at Yale University before he began working at Alcatraz.
 Parminder Nagra as Dr. Lucille "Lucy" Banerjee, Agent Hauser's technician/colleague and friend. In 1963, she was known as Dr. Lucille Sengupta, who served as a psychiatrist at Alcatraz, and apparently had the potential of a romantic relationship with Hauser before she vanished. She spent some time in a coma after she was injured during one of the first cases, but recovered thanks to a blood transfusion from Webb Porter due to the accelerated healing of certain inmates due to tests they underwent at Alcatraz.
 Jonny Coyne as Edwin James, the warden of Alcatraz. Although more tolerant of the prisoners, he has been shown to resort to psychological torture in order to learn crucial information about them, such as manipulating Ernest Cobb's attempts to be placed in solitary confinement or threatening to leave Kit Nelson in a small dark room until Nelson admits the truth about his first crime. He apparently vanished with the rest of the inmates, and his present whereabouts are unknown, although he appears to be the only person who knew what was really going on at Alcatraz.
 Jason Butler Harner as Elijah Bailey "E.B." Tiller, the deputy warden of Alcatraz, whose cynical views of the inmates often put him at odds with James; he was killed in the present by Jack Sylvane in the pilot, although he still appears in flashbacks to the past where he brutally treated the various inmates.
 Robert Forster as Raymond "Ray" Archer (previously Ray Madsen), Rebecca's great-uncle and former Alcatraz prison guard; he was approached by Hauser to join the task force sixteen years ago, but rejected the offer due to his responsibilities to Rebecca. He now owns a bar and is aware of at least Tommy Madsen's return, although he is generally unaware of the other 63s.

Recurring 
 David Hoflin as Thomas "Tommy" Madsen (#2002), Rebecca's grandfather and Ray's brother who reappeared in 2012 and killed Rebecca's partner; Rebecca was raised believing that he was a guard at the prison until she witnessed the list of '63s'. He is apparently more significant than the other inmates, as Hauser approached Ray specifically due to his connection to Madsen, with Madsen having been underground for several months since his return rather than the more public activities of other inmates.
 Leon Rippy as Dr. Milton Beauregard, the head doctor of Alcatraz who reappeared in 2012 and operates under Hauser.
 Jeananne Goossen as Nikki, a medical examiner in the coroner's office.
 Jeffrey Pierce as Jack Sylvane (#2024), the first inmate tracked down and captured by the Alcatraz Task Force. While most of his targets fit in with his expected pattern – going after Tiller and his brother, who married his ex-wife – he also went to an unconnected house to acquire a distinctive key from a man's safe. His own ignorance of his reasons for requesting that key suggests that there is another agenda behind the inmates' sudden return.

Featured guests

Inmates (in order of appearance)
There were around 302 people on Alcatraz when they all mysteriously vanished, with fewer than 50 of these being prison staff; the other 250+, referred to by Hauser as the '63s, remain some of America's worst recorded criminals. Each one has demonstrated a ruthless skill in their chosen crime fields of expertise and no compunctions about picking up where they left off. Various inmates underwent mysterious experiments involving their blood being extracted, treated with an unidentified process, and then returned to them, those inmates who underwent this procedure possessing a degree of accelerated healing that allows them to recover from wounds in far less time than would normally be expected.
 David Hoflin as Tommy Madsen (#2002)
 Jeffrey Pierce as Jack Sylvane (#2024)
 Joe Egender as Ernest Cobb (#2047)
 Michael Eklund as Kit Nelson (#2046)
 Eric Johnson as Cal Sweeney (#2112)
 James Pizzinato as Paxton Petty (#2223)
 Adam Rothenberg as Johnny McKee (#2055)
 Graham Shiels as Pinky Ames (#2177)
 Travis Aaron Wade as Herman Ames (#2178)
 Theo Rossi as Sonny Burnett (#2088)
 Mahershala Ali as Clarence Montgomery (#2214)
 Rami Malek as Webb Porter (#2012)
 Greg Ellis as Garrett Stillman (#2109)
 Brendan Fletcher as Joe Limerick (Ghost)
 Max Clough as Prison Thug

Guards
 Jim Parrack as Guy Hastings
 Frank Whaley as Officer Donovan
 Robbie Amell as the young Raymond "Ray" Archer

Episodes

Production

In November 2011, Elizabeth Sarnoff, co-creator of the series, stepped down as executive producer. She remained as an "executive consultant".

The show was filmed in Vancouver and San Francisco. Scenes from the second episode prominently feature Vancouver's Toronto-Dominion Bank and Vancouver Film School, as well as backdrops of the port facilities.

Connection to the actual prison
The series renewed the public's interest in the actual Alcatraz prison, so much so that the National Park Service had to install warning signs for its public tours. Fans of the TV series broke away from tours in an attempt to find the "nerve center" that is shown underneath the prison on the show. The signs state: "The TV show Alcatraz is fictional. Many areas it depicts are not real. Closed areas protect you, historic structures and nesting birds."

International distribution

Home video release
Warner Home Video released the entire series in DVD and Blu-ray Disc formats on October 16, 2012. Both the three-disc DVD and two-disc Blu-ray sets featured deleted scenes, a gag reel, the "Alcatraz: Island of Intrigue" featurette of the cast and crew, and a 6-page full-color collectible booklet. The United States Blu-ray version also featured digital UltraViolet versions of each episode.

Reception

In June 2011, Alcatraz was one of eight honorees in the Most Exciting New Series category at the 1st Critics' Choice Television Awards, elected by journalists who had seen the pilots. It has an aggregate score of 63/100 on Metacritic, denoting "generally favorable reviews". Newsdays Verne Gay liked the series, but stated "'Traz' shares some of the DNA of The 4400 (of all shows) with a strand or two stripped from the genetic code of FlashForward. Love all these aforementioned worthies." Robert Bianco of USA Today wrote: "Alcatraz is easy enough to follow, with twists and surprises that are enjoyable and not enervating. But you still may leave it wondering how long it will be before there are eight timelines and six universes." New Yorks Matt Zoller Seitz panned the series, saying, "The characters are so TV cute (and in some cases TV pretty) and the storytelling so mechanical, that I couldn't give myself over to it either way."

The series opened with over 10 million U.S. viewers, but for the season finale, it had decreased to 4.75 million U.S viewers, the series' lowest viewership. In the UK, the pilot episode debuted on March 15, 2012, with 496,000 viewers, marking UKTV's Watch channel's highest debut for the time-slot since 2011's Dynamo: Magician Impossible.

U.S. ratings

Awards 
In 2011, the series was honored, along with seven others, with the Critics' Choice Television Award for Most Exciting New Series.

References

External links
 
 Alcatraz at TV Guide

2010s American crime drama television series
2010s American science fiction television series
2012 American television series debuts
2012 American television series endings
Alcatraz Island in fiction
American prison television series
Television series by Bad Robot Productions
English-language television shows
Fictional portrayals of the San Francisco Police Department
Fox Broadcasting Company original programming
Nonlinear narrative television series
Television series by Warner Bros. Television Studios
Television shows set in San Francisco
American time travel television series
2010s prison television series
Unfinished creative works
Television series set in 1963
2010s American time travel television series
Television shows filmed in Vancouver